Effie Julia Margaret Cardale  (20 May 1873 – 19 October 1960) was a New Zealand community and welfare worker. She was born in Christchurch, New Zealand, on 20 May 1873. She was appointed a Member of the Order of the British Empire in the 1949 New Year Honours for services in connection with the Society for the Protection of Women and Children.

References

1873 births
1960 deaths
New Zealand social workers
People from Christchurch
New Zealand Members of the Order of the British Empire